Stempfferia michelae, the furry epitola, is a butterfly in the family Lycaenidae. It is found in Guinea, Sierra Leone, Liberia, Ivory Coast, Ghana, Nigeria, Cameroon, Gabon, the Republic of the Congo, Angola and the Democratic Republic of the Congo. The habitat consists of forests.

A pupa and a pupal case were found on a leaf about 30 cm from a large carton nest of Crematogaster buchneri.

Subspecies
Stempfferia michelae michelae (Guinea, Sierra Leone, Liberia, Ivory Coast, Ghana, southern Nigeria)
Stempfferia michelae centralis Libert, 1999 (Cameroon, Gabon, Congo, Angola, north-western Democratic Republic of the Congo, possibly Nigeria: Oban Hills)

References

Butterflies described in 1999
Poritiinae